Jilted is the past tense of jilt and may refer to:

 "Jilted", the eighth song from The Puppini Sisters' 2007 album The Rise and Fall of Ruby Woo
 Jilted (film), a 1987 film directed by Bill Bennett
 "Jilted" (song), a popular song with music by Dick Manning and lyrics by Robert Colby